The Super Dvora Mark III-class patrol boat is the latest generation of the Dvora family of fast patrol boats or fast attack craft (FPB/FAC).

Design and construction

Performance 
The Super Dvora Mk III craft features interception of sea target at high-speeds approaching 50 knots; long-range missions thanks to its sea replenishment ability ahead of a typical four-day endurance; high maneuverability in both open ocean and littoral environment; steady sea keeping in a range of sea states and very callous weather; and the ability to incorporate advanced, stabilized, accurate marine arsenal and sensors. Taken as a whole, vessel displacement varies from 72 to 58 tons depending on the operation package.

These vessels are fast and agile, and designed to reach and maintain high operating tempos. Its hull geometry provides constant sea keeping at all speeds, and a dry deck throughout high-speed runs and tracking down.

Propulsion system 
The propulsion system consists of two Detroit Diesel MTU 12V-4000 ( total) engines driving two articulated surface drives, which were initially designed for competitive speedboats. Arneson Surface Drive-16 articulating propulsion systems drives provide the vessel with thrust vectoring control. Beside those systems, Mk IIIs are also equipped with ZF4650 reduction gears.

Their thrust-vectoring propulsion system allows Super Dvora Mk III to function in shallow waters at draughts of  facilitating special operations forces delivery on enemy shores and catastrophe relief missions.

Armaments 
The Super Dvora Mk III design is robust to allow for the installation of Typhoon 20-30 mm stabilized cannon, heavy machine guns, AGM-114 Hellfire (Surface-to-surface type) missiles, SPIKE NLOS missiles, all of which can be slaved to state-of the art mast-mounted, day/night, long range electro-optic systems including Elbit/El-Op sensors and targeting systems.

Developments 
IAI-Ramta is currently working on a number of new configuration upgrade packages for the Super Dvora platform  as Strike and Littoral Warrior, which consists of a variety of highly advanced precision weapon systems.

Operators

 : Confirmed to be unnamed country in 2015.
 : Active with Israeli Navy. 13 Dvora Mk IIIs in service.
 : 6 Dvora Mk IIIs ordered. The sale is controversial due to its sales while the Rohingya crisis is still going on.
 : 6 active with Sri Lankan navy.

References

Further reading 

Naval ships of Israel
Ships of the Sri Lanka Navy
Patrol boat classes